A primary standard in metrology is a standard that is sufficiently accurate such that it is not calibrated by or subordinate to other standards.  Primary standards are defined via other quantities like length, mass and time.  Primary standards are used to calibrate other standards referred to as working standards. See Hierarchy of Standards.

In chemistry
Standards are used in analytical chemistry. Here, a primary standard is typically a reagent which can be weighed easily, and which is so pure that its weight is truly representative of the number of moles of substance contained. Features of a primary standard include:
 High purity
 Stability (low reactivity)
 Low hygroscopicity (to minimize weight changes due to humidity)
 High equivalent weight (to minimize weighing errors)
 Non-toxicity
 Ready and cheap availability

(The last two are not as essential as the first four.)

Some examples of primary standards for titration of solutions, based on their high purity, are provided:

Arsenic trioxide for making sodium arsenite solution for  standardisation of sodium periodate solution (until Ph. Eur. 3, Appendix 2001 also for iodine and cerium(IV) sulfate solutions, since Ph. Eur. 4, 2002 standardised by sodium thiosulfate)
Benzoic acid for standardisation of waterless basic solutions: ethanolic  sodium and potassium hydroxide, TBAH, and alkali methanolates in methanol, isopropanol, or DMF
Potassium bromate (KBrO3) for standardisation of sodium thiosulfate solutions
Potassium hydrogen phthalate (usually called KHP) for standardisation of aqueous base and perchloric acid in acetic acid solutions
Sodium carbonate for standardisation of aqueous acids: hydrochloric, sulfuric acid and nitric acid solutions (but not acetic acid)
Sodium chloride for standardisation of silver nitrate solutions
Sulfanilic acid for standardisation of sodium nitrite solutions
Zinc powder, after being dissolved in sulfuric or hydrochloric acid, for standardization of EDTA solutions

Such standards are often used to make standard solutions.  These primary standards are used in titration and are essential for determining unknown concentrations or preparing working standards.

See also
Technical standard

References

External links
Analytical Standards. Department of Chemistry, University of Adelaide, Australia.

Analytical chemistry

de:Urtitersubstanz
es:Patrón primario